Chen Chih-yu (born 29 September 1988) is a Taiwanese artistic gymnast. In 2018, he won the bronze medal in the men's rings event at the 2018 Asian Games held in Jakarta, Indonesia.

In 2016, he competed at the 2016 Gymnastics Olympic Test Event held in Rio de Janeiro, Brazil.

References

External links 
 

Living people
1988 births
Place of birth missing (living people)
Taiwanese male artistic gymnasts
Gymnasts at the 2010 Asian Games
Gymnasts at the 2014 Asian Games
Gymnasts at the 2018 Asian Games
Medalists at the 2010 Asian Games
Medalists at the 2018 Asian Games
Asian Games bronze medalists for Chinese Taipei
Asian Games medalists in gymnastics
21st-century Taiwanese people